The Rivanna Farm, originally called Eglenton, is a historic home and farm located near Bremo Bluff in Fluvanna County, Virginia.  The main house is the work by grassroots builder and architect, Capt. John B. Anderson, father of architect D. Wiley Anderson, who assisted in its construction.  It was built in 1880, and is a two-story, frame dwelling in the Italianate style. Also on the property are the contributing kitchen / quarter building, smokehouse, overseer's house, two corncribs, stable, bath house / tool shed, granary, well, and schoolhouse / tenant house. Farm operations started at the Rivanna Farm site in 1839.

The property was listed on the National Register of Historic Places in 2001.

References

Houses on the National Register of Historic Places in Virginia
Farms on the National Register of Historic Places in Virginia
Italianate architecture in Virginia
Houses completed in 1880
Houses in Fluvanna County, Virginia
National Register of Historic Places in Fluvanna County, Virginia